The 1903–04 season was Manchester City F.C.'s thirteenth season of league football and first season in the top flight of English football. Following their promotion, City made an immediate challenge for the league championship, falling at the last hurdle but finishing creditably second. They did, however, take the FA Cup in the same season, winning their first major trophy of their existence and becoming the 19th winner in the trophy's 33rd year with a 1–0 victory over Bolton Wanderers.

Football League First Division

Results summary

Reports

FA Cup

Squad statistics

Squad
Appearances for competitive matches only

Scorers

All

League

FA Cup

See also
Manchester City F.C. seasons

References

External links
Extensive Manchester City statistics site

1903-04
English football clubs 1903–04 season